is a railway station in the city of Toyota, Aichi Prefecture, Japan, operated by the third sector Aichi Loop Railway Company.

Lines

Station layout
The station has a single elevated side platform with the station building located underneath. The station building has automated ticket machines, TOICA automated turnstiles and is staffed.

Adjacent stations

Station history
Aikan-Umetsubo Station was opened on March 1, 2005.

Passenger statistics
In fiscal 2017, the station was used by an average of 1905 passengers daily.

Surrounding area
 Umetsubo Station
 Umetsubo Elementary School

See also
 List of railway stations in Japan

References

External links

Official home page 

Railway stations in Japan opened in 2005
Railway stations in Aichi Prefecture
Toyota, Aichi